Kord Kandi (also Romanized as Kord Kandī; also known as Khūrdi Kandi and Kurdkand) is a village in Mehranrud-e Markazi Rural District of the Central District of Bostanabad County, East Azerbaijan province, Iran. At the 2006 census, its population was 4,253 in 798 households. The following census in 2011 counted 4,321 people in 1,138 households. The latest census in 2016 showed a population of 4,439 people in 1,253 households; it was the largest village in its rural district.

References 

Bostanabad County

Populated places in East Azerbaijan Province

Populated places in Bostanabad County